Ahmed Lemsyeh (born in 1950 in Sidi Smail) is a Moroccan poet. He writes his poems mainly in Moroccan Darija. Lemsyeh writes for the journal Al-Ittih'ad al-Ishtiraki and teaches at a high school in Rabat.<ref>{{Cite web |url=http://maghrebi-studies.nitle.org/newmaghrebistudies.nitle.org/index.php/maghrebi/literature/key_literature_figures |title=Stephanie Enemark, Some Key Figures |access-date=2008-05-26 |archive-url=https://web.archive.org/web/20080331200857/http://maghrebi-studies.nitle.org/newmaghrebistudies.nitle.org/index.php/maghrebi/literature/key_literature_figures |archive-date=2008-03-31 |url-status=dead |df= }}</ref> He worked as an inspector for the Ministry of Culture in Morocco, and as an advisor to the Minister of Culture Mohamed Achaari.

He has 25 published works, including 18 collections of poetry, which include:
 Riyyah... Allati Sata-'ti رياح... التي ستأتي (Winds... that will come) (1976) in Moroccan Darija
 Fayadan Aththalj فيضان الثلج (Snow Flood) (1986) in Arabic
 Skun Trez Lma شكون اطرز لما'' (Who embroidered the water) (1994) in Moroccan Darija

References

20th-century Moroccan poets
1950 births
Living people
21st-century Moroccan poets